Sławomir Starosta (born 17 August 1965) is a Polish LGBT activist, musician, journalist and publisher of porn magazines and gay porn websites.

Biography
Starosta was born in Warsaw in Poland. In 1987, as a student of University of Warsaw, he co-founded and was the first vice-president of Warsaw Gay Movement.

In April 1987, during ILGA-Conference in Cologne (Germany), he registered Warsaw Gay Movement to become a member of ILGA. In 1990, he co-founded of "Stowarzyszenie Grup Lambda" (en: Association of Lambda Groups), which in 1997 transformed into Lambda Warszawa.

Music career
He started his music career in 1985 as keyboardist and singer. He was member of follows music-bands:
1985–1987: Kosmetyki Mrs. Pinki (punk rock) – keyboard instrument and singing 
1987–1989: Wańka Wstańka (rock music) – keyboard instrument and singing
1989–2004: Balkan Electrique (rock music with Balkan music influences) – keyboard instrument and singing

Porn publishing 
In 1990 he became a leading porn publisher in Poland. He was co-founder of publishing houses: Pink Press and Pink Service, specialized for gay porn magazines and movies on DVD. He was editor-manager of gay magazines:
1991–1996: "MEN!" 
1995–1999: "Nowy Men"
1999–2004: "Gejzer" 
He published porn magazines and movies on DVD as well for heterosexual customers: "Wamp" and "Nowy Wamp". At present time he is editor-manager of porn-websites for Polish gays.

References

1965 births
Polish LGBT rights activists
Gay singers
Polish LGBT singers
Polish gay musicians
Polish rock singers
Polish rock musicians
Adult magazine publishers (people)
Polish pornographers
Living people
20th-century Polish male singers
21st-century Polish male singers
21st-century Polish singers